Salem Tipitapa is a Nicaraguan football team playing in the second division of the Nicaragua football system. It is based near Tipitapa.

Achievements
Segunda División de Nicaragua: 0
TBD

List of coaches
  Jorge Linhares (July 2014–)

See also 
 Segunda División de Nicaragua

External links
 Equipo – GoolNica

Football clubs in Nicaragua